Filament Games is an American educational video game developer based in Madison, Wisconsin and founded in 2005 by partners Daniel White, Daniel Norton, and Alexander Stone. It is a full-service digital studio that develops learning games on a for-hire basis.

Philosophy
Filament's design philosophy based on the scholarship of Kurt Squire, Constance Steinkuehler, and James Paul Gee. Filament is also an affiliate of the annual Games Learning and Society Conference.

History
The company received national recognition for their series of civics games launched by Sandra Day O'Connor for iCivics, her civics-education initiative. These games include Do I Have a Right?, Executive Command, and Liberty Belle's Immigration Nation.  Filament has also developed games with partners such as Meta, the Smithsonian Science Education Center, and Columbia University.

Development History

References

External links
 Company website
Filament Learning website

Video game companies of the United States
Companies based in Madison, Wisconsin
Companies established in 2005